James Galbraith may refer to:

Sir James Galbraith, 1st Baronet (–1827), Irish politician
James Galbraith (British Army officer) (1833–1880), Irish officer in the British Army
James Galbraith (British politician) (1872–1945), British Conservative politician, MP for East Surrey
James Ponsonby Galbraith, Lord Lieutenant of Tyrone
James Galbraith (Canadian politician) (born 1940), Canadian politician
James K. Galbraith (born 1952), American economist and writer
James Galbraith (footballer), Scottish footballer